Conor Vivian Dolan (born 5 April 1962 in Blenheim, New Zealand, also sometimes known as C.V. Dolan) is a New Zealand psychologist and professor in the Faculty of Behavioural and Movement Sciences at Vrije Universiteit Amsterdam.

References

External links
Faculty page

New Zealand psychologists
University of Amsterdam alumni
Living people
Academic staff of Vrije Universiteit Amsterdam
1962 births